Sheikh Idris was a Nepalese politician who served as a minister of forest and soil conservation. He served as minister of Nepali Congress cabinet in 1990. He was awarded with Mahaujjwal Rastradeep Man Padavi on September 2018 by president of Nepal Bidhya Devi Bhandari.

References

Nepalese Muslims
Nepali Congress politicians from Madhesh Province
Year of birth missing (living people)
Living people
Nepal MPs 1959–1960
Nepal MPs 1991–1994
Nepal MPs 1994–1999